The Eradaa Movement,, is an Iraqi political party established by Iraqi MP Hanan Saeed Mohsen al-Fatlawi.

History
This political party was founded on March 15, 2015 by Iraqi MP Hanan Saeed Mohsen al-Fatlawi. The party won the first official party to be granted the "Eradaa Movement" of Hanan Saeed Mohsen al-Fatlawi from Independent High Electoral Commission.

References

External links
 official website of  Eradaa Movement

2015 establishments in Iraq
Formerly banned political parties
Islamic political parties in Iraq
Political parties established in 2015
Political parties in Iraq
Shia Islam in Iraq
Shia Islamic political parties